Star Trek: Prodigy is an American animated television series created by Kevin and Dan Hageman for the streaming service Paramount+ and the cable channel Nickelodeon. It is the tenth Star Trek series and debuted in 2021 as part of executive producer Alex Kurtzman's expanded Star Trek Universe. Prodigy is the first Star Trek series to target younger audiences, and is also the franchise's first animated series to solely use 3D animation. It follows a group of young aliens who find the USS Protostar, an abandoned starship.

Brett Gray, Ella Purnell, Jason Mantzoukas, Angus Imrie, Rylee Alazraqui, and Dee Bradley Baker voice the young crew of the USS Protostar, with Jimmi Simpson, John Noble, and Kate Mulgrew also providing voices for the series, the latter reprising her role as Kathryn Janeway from Star Trek: Voyager. Kurtzman first mentioned the series in January 2019, and it was confirmed a month later. The Hageman brothers were set as creators and showrunners, and Nickelodeon ordered two seasons of Prodigy that April. Ben Hibon was announced as director and creative lead in August 2020, and it was revealed in February 2021 that the series would debut on Paramount+ before airing on Nickelodeon. It is produced by CBS Eye Animation Productions and Nickelodeon Animation Studio in association with Secret Hideout, Roddenberry Entertainment, and Brothers Hageman Productions.

Star Trek: Prodigy premiered on Paramount+ on October 28, 2021, and the first 10 episodes were released until February 2022. The series began airing on Nickelodeon on December 17, 2021. The next 10 episodes of the first season were released on Paramount+ from October to December 2022. A second season is set to premiere in 2023. The series was met with positive reviews from critics and received a Children's and Family Emmy Award.

Premise
In 2383, five years after the USS Voyager returned to Earth at the end of Star Trek: Voyager, a motley crew of young aliens find an abandoned Starfleet ship, the USS Protostar, in the Tars Lamora prison colony. Taking control of the ship, they must learn to work together as they make their way from the Delta Quadrant to the Alpha Quadrant.

Cast and characters

Main 
 Brett Gray as Dal R'El: a 17-year-old "maverick" of unknown species who takes the role of captain on the USS Protostar. Dal later learns that he is an augmented human with DNA from multiple alien species.
 Ella Purnell as Gwyndala: a 17-year-old Vau N'Akat nicknamed "Gwyn" who dreamed of exploring the stars while growing up on her father's prison asteroid. A talented linguist, she has learned many alien languages.
 Jason Mantzoukas as Jankom Pog: an argumentative 16-year-old Tellarite. Having been born before the Tellarites joined the Federation, he awoke on a long-range sleeper ship. He handles repair duties on the Protostar.
 Angus Imrie as Zero: a Medusan—a noncorporeal, genderless, energy-based lifeform—who wears a containment suit to stop others from going mad at the sight of them.
 Rylee Alazraqui as Rok-Tahk: a shy, 8-year-old Brikar. Despite being large and strong, she defies being typecast as the ship's security officer and instead develops an interest in science.
 Dee Bradley Baker as Murf: an apparently indestructible Mellanoid slime worm with good timing and an appetite for ship parts. The character was initially added as a joke, with Dal arriving to find a "semi-sentient blob" had joined the crew, but the writers soon fell in love with the idea of having a "dog-type character" in the series that children would enjoy. In the second half of the first season, the writers gave Murf a character arc beyond "just eating things", with the character evolving to have a more humanoid form.
 Jimmi Simpson as Drednok: the Diviner's deadly robotic enforcer. Co-showrunner Kevin Hageman said the robot was "very still, and silent, and soft-spoken", which contrasted with the more driven personality of the Diviner. Simpson described Drednok as a more verbose version of the character Maximilian from the film The Black Hole (1979).
 John Noble as the Diviner: Gwyn's father and a ruthless tyrant who controls the asteroid Tars Lamora and searches for the Protostar. The character, and Noble's performance, were inspired by Ricardo Montalbán's Star Trek villain Khan Noonien Singh. The character initially just appears floating in a tank, which was inspired by the floating Guild Navigator creature from David Lynch's Dune (1984).
 Kate Mulgrew as Kathryn Janeway: Mulgrew primarily voices the Protostar Emergency Training Holographic Advisor, which is based on the likeness of Janeway, the former captain of the USS Voyager. She also voices the real Janeway, now a Starfleet Vice Admiral in command of the USS Dauntless.

Recurring 
 Bonnie Gordon as the USS Protostar computer
 Robert Beltran as Chakotay: the original captain of the Protostar
 Jameela Jamil as the Vindicator: a member of the Diviner's species masquerading as Starfleet ensign Asencia aboard the USS Dauntless
 Jason Alexander as Noum: a Tellarite medical officer on the Dauntless
 Daveed Diggs as Tysess: the Andorian first officer of the Dauntless
 Billy Campbell as Thadiun Okona: a rogue freighter captain who briefly becomes a "questionable guide" for the Protostar crew
 Ronny Cox as Edward Jellico: a Starfleet admiral and Janeway's superior.

Guest 
 René Auberjonois as Odo: a famous space station security officer and Changeling who appears as a hologram. Archival audio of Auberjonois from Star Trek: Deep Space Nine is used for the series.
 James Doohan as Montgomery Scott: a famous Starfleet engineer who appears as a hologram. Archival audio of Doohan from Star Trek: The Original Series and Star Trek: The Next Generation is used for the series.
 Nichelle Nichols as Nyota Uhura: a famous Starfleet communications officer who appears as a hologram. Archival audio of Nichols from The Original Series and Star Trek II: The Wrath of Khan (1982) is used for the series.
 Leonard Nimoy as Spock: a famous Starfleet science officer who appears as a hologram. Archival audio of Nimoy from The Original Series, Star Trek: The Motion Picture (1979), The Wrath of Khan, and The Next Generation is used for the series.
 David Ruprecht as the captain of the Kobayashi Maru who appears as a hologram. Archival audio of Ruprecht from The Wrath of Khan is used for the series.
 Gates McFadden as Beverly Crusher: a famous Starfleet medical officer who appears as a hologram
 Grey Griffin as Nandi: a female Ferengi smuggler who raised Dal
 Eric Bauza as Barniss Frex: a Starfleet lieutenant
 Fred Tatasciore as Garrovick: an ensign on the USS Enterprise during The Original Series
 Kimberly Brooks as Kaseth: a Romulan commander
 Amy Hill as Dr. Jago: a geneticist
 Erin Macdonald as Dr. Macdonald: a Starfleet scientist

Episodes

Production

Development
In June 2018, after becoming sole showrunner of the series Star Trek: Discovery, Alex Kurtzman signed a five-year overall deal with CBS Television Studios to expand the Star Trek franchise beyond Discovery to several new series, miniseries, and animated series. After the announcement of adult animated comedy Star Trek: Lower Decks, Kurtzman said in January 2019 that there would be at least one more animated series released as part of his expansion. This would be a "kids-focused" series that could potentially be released on a different network from the more adult-focused streaming service CBS All Access (later rebranded Paramount+) where the other Star Trek series under Kurtzman were being released. Kurtzman said other animated series would be different from Lower Decks in both tone and visual style, with the latter potentially being achieved through different technology.

Kevin and Dan Hageman joined the series as writers by mid-February 2019, when Nickelodeon was in talks to air the show since its viewers match the series' younger target audience. The project was expected to be a "major tentpole series" for the network under its new president Brian Robbins. A month later, Kurtzman confirmed the project and said negotiations with Nickelodeon were almost complete. He expected the series to be ready for release in 2021 or 2022. Nickelodeon officially ordered the series in late April 2019 and the Hageman brothers were confirmed to be writing and executive producing the series alongside Kurtzman, Secret Hideout's Heather Kadin, Rod Roddenberry (the son of Star Trek creator Gene Roddenberry) and Trevor Roth of Roddenberry Entertainment, and CBS Television's animation executive Katie Krentz. Kadin revealed in October 2019 that Nickelodeon had ordered two seasons of the series due to the animation work that was required. She also explained that the Hagemans were hired due to their work on previous children's series that did not play down to the audience and were still watchable for older viewers. She felt older Star Trek fans would be able to watch the series with their children to introduce them to the franchise.

In an article on the Star Trek franchise in January 2020, The Wall Street Journal listed the series as Star Trek: Prodigy. This title was officially confirmed in July, along with a 2021 release date. Ramsey Naito was overseeing the series for Nickelodeon as EVP of Animation Production and Development. Ben Hibon was announced as director, co-executive producer, and creative lead for the series in August 2020. Naito described Hibon as "an incredible storyteller and a world builder with a distinct vision" for the series. In February 2021, ViacomCBS announced that Prodigy would debut on the streaming service Paramount+ along with the rest of the Star Trek Universe. Paramount+'s EVP of development and programming, Julie McNamara, said they would have the "best of both worlds" with this move by introducing the series to fans of the other Star Trek series on the service before bringing it to new audiences on Nickelodeon. She added that viewership data from CBS All Access showed that fans of Star Trek also watched the animated series The Legend of Korra on the service, and this was another factor in deciding to add Prodigy to Paramount+. At that time, the first season was revealed to have 20 episodes. A second 20-episode season was officially confirmed by Paramount+ in November. First season writer Aaron Waltke was promoted to co-head writer and co-executive producer of the second season.

Waltke stated in November 2022 that he and the Hagemans had discussed continuing the series beyond the first two seasons, and they hoped it could run for seven seasons and expand to films after that.

Writing

The Hageman brothers announced the series' writers room in July 2019, which included Julie and Shawna Benson, Diandra Pendleton-Thompson, Chad Quandt, Aaron Waltke, Lisa Shoop Boyd, Nikhil Jayaram, Erin McNamara, and Keith Sweet. Star Trek author David Mack served as a consultant and adviser on the series. Astrophysicist Erin Macdonald also served as a consultant on the series after being hired as a general science advisor for the Star Trek franchise. She worked in the writers room, and unlike the other Star Trek series—for which she focused on scientific accuracy—her role on Prodigy was focused on STEM education for the series' younger target audience.

The series features a group of young aliens from the distant Delta Quadrant who learn about Starfleet and its ideals, which introduces Star Trek concepts to new, young audiences. Kevin Hageman felt young viewers may not be able to identify with the "fully formed officers" who star in most Star Trek series, so Prodigy starring younger characters also helped with the target audience being engaged. Waltke explained that the first two seasons were written to tell one continuous story across four 10-episode "mini-arcs". He said the series would change in tone each season as the characters grow up because the writers saw the series as a story about young people joining Starfleet and moving up the ranks. Waltke also said the series would not ignore the events of other Star Trek projects set during the 2380s, including the concurrent series Lower Decks and Star Trek: Picard. The writers worked with the showrunners of the other series to ensure continuity.

Casting
During New York Comic-Con in October 2020, Kate Mulgrew was announced to be reprising her role of Kathryn Janeway from Star Trek: Voyager. Further casting for the series was expected to be revealed in the following months. Kurtzman said bringing Mulgrew back for the series was part of the Hagemans' initial pitch, and he felt their reasoning was compelling enough to meet his requirements that "legacy characters" like Janeway only be brought back for a very specific reason. The production had approached Mulgrew about starring in the series a year before the official announcement, and Kurtzman was surprised that her involvement had not leaked during that time. Mulgrew was initially reluctant to join the series, but after several months of negotiations she was convinced to reprise her role by the idea of introducing Star Trek to a new generation of fans. The series' version of Janeway is a hologram aboard the USS Protostar that is based on the original character's likeness, though the actual Janeway also appears. The hologram Janeway helps train the series' bridge crew, which features six young misfits who, in a first for the Star Trek franchise, are all aliens rather than human. Mulgrew revealed in January 2021 that recording for the first season had been completed, and recording on the second season was about to begin. The main voice cast for the series was announced in June 2021, including Rylee Alazraqui as Rok-Tahk, Brett Gray as Dal, Angus Imrie as Zero, Jason Mantzoukas as Jankom Pog, Ella Purnell as Gwyn, and Dee Bradley Baker as Murf. At the end of August, John Noble was announced as voicing Gwyn's father, the Diviner, with Jimmi Simpson cast as the Diviner's robotic enforcer Drednok.

Bonnie Gordon was hired to provide temporary "scratch vocals" for Gwyn and Janeway during the series' development, which led to her getting a permanent role as the voice of the USS Protostar computer. Gordon also provides the voice for a Brenari ensign in the first season's penultimate episode who is one of the refugees Janeway rescued in the Voyager episode "Counterpoint". Billy Campbell revealed in February 2021 that he was reprising his guest role of Thadiun Okona from Star Trek: The Next Generation in the series and said his role was one of several "legacy characters" that were returning for Prodigy. Robert Beltran, who portrayed Chakotay in Voyager, said he was working on Prodigy in August, and was confirmed that October to be reprising his role. Other recurring guests announced in October 2021 include Daveed Diggs as Commander Tysess, Jameela Jamil as Ensign Asencia, and Jason Alexander as Dr. Noum. Alexander previously had a different guest role in Voyager. Campbell's role was officially confirmed in September 2022; he recurs as Okona during the second-half of the first season. He suggested adding an eyepatch to the character's design, which the Prodigy showrunners informed the Star Trek: Lower Decks producers of to ensure continuity with Okona's appearance in that series. At New York Comic-Con in October, Ronny Cox was announced to also have a recurring role in the second-half of the first season, reprising his role as Edward Jellico from The Next Generation who has been promoted to admiral.

In the sixth episode, Dal takes a holographic simulation of the Kobayashi Maru captaincy test from the film Star Trek II: The Wrath of Khan (1982). In the film, cadets took the test with experienced Starfleet officers as their crew which Waltke chose to replicate by including famous Starfleet officers from previous Star Trek series in the simulation. He originally wanted eight well-known crewmembers and the writers debated which ones to include. This was narrowed down to five characters: René Auberjonois's Odo from Star Trek: Deep Space Nine; James Doohan's Montgomery Scott, Nichelle Nichols's Nyota Uhura, and Leonard Nimoy's Spock from Star Trek: The Original Series; and Gates McFadden's Beverly Crusher from Star Trek: The Next Generation. Archival audio was used, except for McFadden who returned to provide new vocals for the episode. Waltke read around 90 scripts for past Star Trek episodes and watched 40 of those episodes to find lines that could fit into these scenes. He then pulled the dialogue for those lines from the Star Trek archives to be used in the episode. The episode "All the World's a Stage" explains why the character Ensign Garrovick disappeared between the second and third seasons of Star Trek: The Original Series, revealing that he crash-landed on a planet and influenced its culture in a similar way to the Original Series episode "A Piece of the Action". Star Trek: Lower Decks star Fred Tatasciore provided the voice for Garrovick, who was portrayed by Stephen Brooks in the Original Series episode "Obsession".

The Hagemans said in October 2022 that the series' search for Beltran's Captain Chakotay would continue into the second season, and that other "legacy characters" from previous Star Trek series would also be included. In December, Cox said he was also "probably" returning for the second season.

Animation
When the series was announced, Kurtzman expected it would take around a year for each season's animation work to be completed. During their initial discussions when Hibon first joined the project, the Hagemans said that they wanted to create an "epic" scope without losing the characters and emotion. Using computer-generated animation was the logical choice for Hibon, as he felt it would give the production all the tools they needed to create a cinematic series that was on-par with the live-action entries in the franchise. Using CG animation also differentiated Prodigy from the previous Star Trek animated series, Star Trek: The Animated Series and Lower Decks. The series' design style was first developed through 2D drawings before being animated with 3D CG animation, and Kurtzman compared it to the animated anthology series Love, Death & Robots in terms of "beauty and lighting and cinema". Kadin further compared the style to the Hagemans' previous work on the animated series Ninjago and Trollhunters, while Kurtzman said the series' animation was feature film-quality and would hold up if projected in cinemas. In August 2020, Kurtzman said work on the series' animation was "barreling ahead, full steam ahead" in contrast to the live-action Star Trek series that had been delayed by the COVID-19 pandemic.

The series' designers tried to make the initial designs feel more grounded than previous Star Trek series, with the intention of integrating more of the "classic language" of Star Trek designs into Prodigy as the main characters move closer to the Federation and Starfleet. The USS Protostar, the central ship of the series, has a similar design to the USS Voyager. The series' opening title sequence follows the Protostar through various spatial anomalies, planets, and debris fields that form into images of the main cast.

Music
In August 2020, Kurtzman said Nami Melumad had been hired to compose the music for a new Star Trek series after impressing with her work on the Star Trek: Short Treks short "Q&A". He did not reveal which series she had been hired for, but it was believed that this could be Prodigy based on Melumad's Twitter activity. She was confirmed to be composing for the series in October. The series' main theme was composed by Michael Giacchino, who supervised Melumad's Short Treks work and also composed the music for the Kelvin Timeline Star Trek films. Melumad was comfortable working with Giacchino's theme after their previous work together, and because her own style was influenced by his.

Melumad was the first woman to compose the music for a Star Trek series, which she said was "a huge honor, and [a] great responsibility". When she first joined the project, the showrunners sent her a Spotify playlist with music that they listened to while developing the series, which included Giacchino's score for the film John Carter (2012). Giacchino's advice to Melumad was to not overuse the series' main theme or the original Star Trek theme by Alexander Courage, so they would feel earned when they do get used. She settled on using the main theme only in the most triumphant moments for the main characters. Melumad composed several other themes, including for each of the main characters. To represent Jankom, Melumad used the trombone and "a little bit of a clumsy" melody. Zero's theme uses a piccolo, while Gwyn's features a "keyboard-y kind of bell tone sound". Melumad did not reprise Jerry Goldsmith's main theme from Star Trek: Voyager to represent Hologram Janeway, since the character represents Starfleet in general within the series and because she felt the young target audience would not recognize the theme anyway. She did say that the music becomes "more Star Trek-y" as the series goes on, especially as the main characters begin to interact with Starfleet in the second half of the first season.

The score was recorded in Budapest with a 64-musician orchestra, and Melumad was glad that this was not impacted by the COVID-19 pandemic, which had forced other series to record their musicians individually. Selections from the score are being released after the debut of each episode, leading to a full soundtrack album at the end of the first season. All music by Nami Melumad, except where noted:

Marketing
The title and logo were revealed at the virtual Star Trek Universe panel during the July 2020 Comic-Con@Home convention, while Mulgrew's casting was announced at another virtual Star Trek Universe panel for New York Comic-Con in October 2020. A first look at the main characters was released during the February 2021 ViacomCBS Investor Day, and a first look at Hologram Janeway was revealed during the "First Contact Day" virtual event on April 5, 2021, celebrating the fictional holiday marking first contact between humans and aliens in the Star Trek universe. At the Television Critics Association press tour in August 2021, the opening title sequence was revealed along with Giacchino's main theme. After being the dominant producer of Star Trek collectible figures in the 1990s, Playmates Toys returned to the franchise in 2022 with new figures based on Prodigy. To promote the series' Nickelodeon debut, the family-friendly, space-themed interactive experience at CAMP Experience in Brooklyn, New York, was redressed to be Prodigy-themed from July 22 to August 29.

Mulgrew and Gray promoted the series at a "Star Trek Day" event on September 8, 2022, where the mid-season premiere date was announced and a new clip from the second half of the first season was shown. A mid-season trailer was revealed by the Hagemans at the Star Trek Universe panel for New York Comic-Con in October, which also featured Mulgrew, Gray, Jamil, and executive producers Kurtzman, Roddenberry, and Hibon. For the second half of the first season, an excerpt from Admiral Janeway's personal log was released each week on Instagram. The logs were written by Waltke and voiced by Mulgrew, and include details that are not revealed in the series. These include the USS Protostar original mission to complete the work started by the USS Voyager in the Delta Quadrant, and the involvement of Voyager character B'Elanna Torres in the design of the USS Dauntless.

Release

Streaming and broadcast
Star Trek: Prodigy premiered on October 28, 2021, on the streaming service Paramount+, in the United States. The series is being released in other countries as Paramount+ is made available to them. CTV Sci-Fi Channel broadcasts the series in Canada. The first five episodes were released through November 18, followed by a break before the rest of the first 10 episodes were released beginning on January 6, 2022. The series premiered on the cable channel Nickelodeon, which originally ordered the series, on December 17, 2021, before a weekly airing on the channel of the first half of the first season from July 8 to August 5, 2022. After their Nickelodeon debut, the episodes are made available on Nick.com, the Nick App, and Nick On Demand. The 10-episode second half of the first season was released on Paramount+ in the U.S. beginning October 27, 2022.

Home media
The first 10 episodes of the first season were released on DVD and Blu-Ray in the U.S. on January 3, 2023. The release includes bonus content and a set of cards featuring key art from the season.

Reception

Critical response 
The review aggregator website Rotten Tomatoes reported a 94% approval rating for the first season, with an average rating of 8.1/10 based on 17 reviews. Metacritic, which uses a weighted average, assigned a score of 68 out of 100 based on reviews from 5 critics, indicating "generally favorable reviews".

Alex Maidy of JoBlo.com rated the series "great" and wrote: "Star Trek: Prodigy proves that it is entirely possible for Gene Roddenberry's vision to be both action-packed and thought-provoking... it is a rip-roaring adventure that will keep adults engaged, make kids think, and opens up endless possibilities for Star Trek more than any other series since the 1966 original." Collier Jennings of Collider praised the series in his review, claiming "it is one of the best new entries in the Star Trek franchise... Prodigy wrings genuine emotion out of its moments, proving that even though it's targeted toward a younger audience it won't speak down to said audience." Tara Bennett of IGN rated the episode 7 out of 10 and wrote: "Prodigy has the slick look of a high-end movie" and "The premiere sets the stage for a credible course for adventure that has the potential to grow into something special." Bennet praised the performances and said Ella Purnell's Gwyn and Rylee Alazraqui's Rok-Tahk are already stealing a lot of their scenes. Joel Keller of Decider.com wrote, "The animation, writing and action sequences make the show equally accessible to Trekkers, as well. Mulgrew's performance as a slightly more wise-acre version of Voyager's Janeway grounds the show in Trek's universe, but only just enough to not get it mired in the franchise's drier, more talky tendencies. The first episode is full of well-designed action that ratchets up tension and keeps all viewers engaged, whether they're kids or grownups." Jeff Ewing of Slashfilm praised Star Trek: Prodigy's bold themes and unique tone aimed at both young and old audiences, noting it is "well-paced for modern audiences with a strong set of character introductions, good action sequences, and a lot of open-ended potential. It strikes as ably accomplishing its goals to introduce younger audiences to the world of "Trek," finding a strong path to do so with its young characters' guided trip through the galaxy." Keith DeCandido, author of several Star Trek novels, praised Prodigy in a review for Tor.com, saying it was even better than Discovery, Picard, and Lower Decks. DeCandido noted that "the target audience is on Nickelodeon, but honestly this show's audience is anyone who loves Star Trek, because this is very much a Trek show." Zack Handlen of The A.V. Club gave the first episode a grade B and said the show had potential. He wrote: "The series is aimed at children, but in a cheery all-ages kind of way that avoids insulting its audience even if it never quite manages to impress them." Shah Shahid of Comic Years praised Prodigy as "a beautiful way to remind audiences of what the promise of a bright future means to those without that hope... and at the end of the day, that is ultimately what Roddenberry intended."

CNN.com's Brian Lowry was critical of the first episode and wrote: "The show mostly just transparently trades off the 'Trek' title without feeling like it's going anywhere, boldly or otherwise."

Accolades

Tie-in media

Publishing
Two tie-in novels are set to be published on January 17, 2023: Star Trek: Prodigy – Supernova, written by longtime Star Trek author Robb Pearlman, is a "middle-grade" story based on the video game of the same name; and Cassandra Rose Clarke's Star Trek: Prodigy – A Dangerous Trade follows the series' young crew as they attempt to trade a Starfleet battery for new parts with a group of rogue traders who plan to steal the Protostar.

Video game
Outright Games, a video game publisher that focuses on family-friendly properties, announced a new video game inspired by the series in April 2022. Titled Star Trek Prodigy: Supernova, the game was developed by Tessera Studios for PC, Xbox, PlayStation, Nintendo Switch, Steam, and Stadia. It was the first Star Trek video game aimed at younger players. The story, written by Prodigy staff writer Lisa Boyd, follows Dal and Gwyn as they attempt to save their friends, the Protostar, and an alien planetary system from a supernova. The game features the series' main cast reprising their roles, including Mulgrew, and was released on October 14, 2022.

References

External links
 
 Star Trek: Prodigy on Paramount+
 
 

2020s American animated television series
2020s American science fiction television series
2021 American television series debuts
American children's animated science fiction television series
American children's animated space adventure television series
American computer-animated television series
Animated television series about extraterrestrial life
Children's and Family Emmy Award winners
English-language television shows
Paramount+ original programming
Paramount+ children's programming
Nickelodeon original programming
Nicktoons
Split television seasons
Prodigy
Television series by CBS Studios
Television series by CBS Eye Animation Productions
Television series by Roddenberry Entertainment
Television shows based on works by Gene Roddenberry